The 2019 North Kesteven District Council election took place on 2 May 2019 to elect members of North Kesteven District Council in Lincolnshire, England. This was held on the same day as other local elections.

Ward results

Ashby de la Launde and Cranwell

Bassingham and Brant Broughton

Billinghay, Martin and North Kyme

Bracebridge Heath and Waddington East

Branston

Cliff Villages

Eagle, Swinderby and Witham St Hughs

Heckington Rural

Heighington and Washingborough

Kirkby la Thorpe and South Kyme

Leasingham and Rauceby

Metheringham

North Hykeham Forum

North Hykeham Memorial

North Hykeham Mill

North Hykeham Moor

North Hykeham Witham

Osbournby

Ruskington

Skellingthorpe

Sleaford Castle

Sleaford Holdingham

Sleaford Navigation

Sleaford Quarrington and Mareham

Sleaford Westholme

Waddington West

By-elections

Billinghay, Martin and North Kyme

A by-election was held in Billinghay, Martin and North Kyme on 13 June 2019. This was because only one candidate had been nominated for the 2-member ward at the May elections, leaving a vacancy to be filled.

Metheringham

Sleaford Castle

References

2019 English local elections
2019
2010s in Lincolnshire
May 2019 events in the United Kingdom